AL3 may refer to:

 AL3, a postcode district in the AL postcode area
 British Rail Class 83